Megalochori is a village and a community in the western part of the volcanic Methana peninsula, Greece. It is located 3 km northwest of Methana town. The community consists of the villages Megalochori, Vathy, Kaimeni Chora and Megalo Potami. The ancient Acropolis of Methana, which was described by Pausanias, is located near Megalochori.

Methana Volcano
Near Megalochori is located the village Kameni Chora. In this place the last volcanic eruption of Methana Volcano happened between  277 and 240 B.C., during the times of Antigonus Gonatas, king of Macedonia.

Historical population

References

Troizinia-Methana
Populated places in Islands (regional unit)